George W. Joseph State Natural Area is a natural area in the U.S. state of Oregon. It is located near the city of Troutdale between Latourell Falls and Guy W. Talbot State Park, and is accessible from both.

The land was donated by the estate of George W. Joseph, a state senator and an influential nominee for Governor of Oregon in 1930.

See also
 List of Oregon state parks

References

External links 
 

State parks of Oregon
Protected areas of Multnomah County, Oregon